Diadegma adelungi is a wasp first described by Kokujev in 1915. No subspecies are listed.

References

adelungi
Insects described in 1915